La Belle is an unincorporated community in Fayette County, Pennsylvania, United States. La Belle has a post office, with ZIP code 15450.

References

Unincorporated communities in Fayette County, Pennsylvania
Unincorporated communities in Pennsylvania